The Murder of Carol Wilkinson was committed on 10 October 1977 in Bradford, West Yorkshire. Anthony Steel spent 19 years in prison for the murder under wrongful conviction, and was acquitted in 2003. Due to poor health, he died shortly after in 2007 at the age of 52.

Murder

Carol Wilkinson was killed as she walked to work in October 1977. The attack took place in a field at the back of the bakery where Wilkinson worked, about fifteen minutes' walk from the estate where she lived. Her best friend at work had heard her say she would not be walking the "muck road" route which Anthony Steel was said to have described in his confession. She was found lying in a pool of blood, with her clothes ripped off. She had been battered with two heavy stones.

She was taken to Bradford Royal Infirmary and placed on a life support machine for three days before the machine was turned off. This was the first time in Britain that a murder victim was certified dead while on life support.

Conviction and acquittal of Anthony Steel

Eighteen months after the killing, Steel's mother-in-law gave the police a keyring in the shape of a fish. The keyring was said by the Crown to have been taken from Wilkinson's handbag by the killer. This keyring was alleged to have been given by Steel to his future wife at about the time of the murder. At the time of the murder, Steel was working as a council gardener on the Ravenscliffe estate where the victim lived. The Crown 
also argued that Steel told the police details that only the murderer would know.

Speaking in an interview about signing the confession, Steel said:

Acquittal

Steel was initially released on licence in 1998 before having his conviction quashed at the Court of Appeal in February 2003, due to new evidence from both defence and Crown consultant psychologists indicating that Steel "is and was mentally handicapped and at the borderline of abnormal suggestibility and compliability. He was therefore a significantly more vulnerable interviewee than could be appreciated at the time of the trial."

Steel received an official police apology and about £100,000 in compensation from the government, but he was in poor health following his release from prison. He died from a heart attack aged 52 in September 2007. None of the police officers involved in the wrongful conviction were reprimanded or prosecuted.

Links to Peter Sutcliffe
Over the years, a number of investigators and writers have asserted that "Yorkshire Ripper" Peter Sutcliffe was the real murderer of Wilkinson. Between 1975 and 1980, Sutcliffe committed 13 murders of women across Yorkshire and Manchester, his signature being to attack his victims with blunt instruments and invariably hitting the victims at random from behind.  Wilkinson's murder had initially been considered as a possible "Ripper" killing, but this was quickly ruled out as Wilkinson was not a prostitute. However, by 1979 police would admit that Sutcliffe did not only attack prostitutes, although by this time Steel had already been convicted of the murder. As soon as Sutcliffe was convicted at trial in 1981, writer David Yallop asserted that Steel had been wrongly jailed for the murder and that Sutcliffe was evidently the killer. He put forward these claims in a book titled Deliver us from Evil, pointing out the similarities to Sutcliffe's known attacks in Bradford, Leeds and elsewhere. Wilkinson's murder took place only 9 days after Sutcliffe's murder of Jean Jordan in Manchester. Around the time of Wilkinson's murder it was widely reported that professor David Gee, the Home Office Pathologist who conducted all the post-mortem examinations on the Ripper victims, said that there were similarities between the murder of Carol Wilkinson and the murder of victim Yvonne Pearson by Peter Sutcliffe. This was committed just three months later. Just like Wilkinson, Pearson was bludgeoned with a heavy stone and was not stabbed, and was initially ruled out as a "Ripper" victim. The amount of similarities between Pearson and Wilkinson's cases led detectives to not only suspect they were copycat killings of each other, but also of the "Ripper" attacks. Pearson was in fact a Ripper victim, and was re-classified as one in 1979, by which time Steel was serving time for Wilkinson's murder. Yallop called for the conviction to be reviewed in 1981 because of the clear similarities, highlighting that Steel had always protested his innocence and been convicted on weak circumstantial evidence. Sutcliffe did not confess to Carol's murder at his Old Bailey trial, although by this time Steel was already the man serving time for the murder. During his imprisonment, Sutcliffe was noted to show "particular anxiety" at mentions of the murder due to the possible unsoundness of the conviction of Steel.

Sutcliffe had in fact known Wilkinson, and was known to have argued violently with Carol's stepfather over his advances towards her. Sutcliffe knew the estate she was killed on and was known to regularly frequent the area, and only months before the murder in February 1977 was reported to police for acting suspiciously on the street Wilkinson lived. Another thing that linked Sutcliffe to the killing was that earlier on the same day as Wilkinson's killing, Sutcliffe had gone back to mutilate Jean Jordan's body before returning to Bradford, showing he had already gone out to attack victims that day and would have been in Bradford to attack Wilkinson after he come back from mutilating Jordan. The location Wilkinson was killed was very close to Sutcliffe's place of employment at T. & W. H. Clark, where he would have clocked in for work that afternoon.

In 2008, David Yallop again put forth the theory that Peter Sutcliffe was the true killer. In 2015, former detective Chris Clark and investigative journalist Tim Tate also supported the theory that Wilkinson was a victim of Sutcliffe in their book Yorkshire Ripper: The Secret Murders. They pointed out that her body had been posed and partially stripped in typical "Yorkshire Ripper" fashion, with her trousers and pants pulled down and her bra lifted up. In 2022, ITV also published a documentary based on Clark and Tate's book titled Yorkshire Ripper: The Secret Murders.

References

Bibliography

External links
 Link to 2022 ITV documentary linking Wilkinson's murder to Peter Sutcliffe.

Crime in Bradford
History of Bradford
Murder in West Yorkshire
Violence against women in England
1977 murders in the United Kingdom
Unsolved murders in England
1977 in England
1977 deaths
Incidents of violence against women
British murder victims
October 1977 events in the United Kingdom
1970s in West Yorkshire
October 1977 crimes